The Tridevi are a trinity of supreme divinity in Hinduism, joining a triad of eminent goddesses either as a feminine version of the Trimurti, or as consorts of a masculine Trimurti, depending on the denomination. This triad is typically personified by the Hindu goddesses Saraswati, Lakshmi, and Parvati. In Shaktism, these triune goddesses are the manifestations of Mula-Prakriti or Adi Parashakti.

Feminine Trimurti 

 

In the traditional androcentric denominations of Hinduism, the feminine Tridevi goddesses are relegated as consorts and auxiliary deities to the more eminent masculine Trimurti gods. In Shaktism, the feminine Tridevi goddesses are given the eminent roles of creator (Mahasaraswati), preserver (Mahalakshmi), and destroyer (Mahakali), with the masculine Trimurti gods being relegated as the auxiliary deities as agents of the feminine Tridevi.

Consorts of the Trimurti 

Saraswati is the goddess of learning, arts, and music, as well as the consort of Brahma, the creator. She is described to be the very embodiment of wisdom.

Lakshmi is the goddess of fortune, wealth, fertility, auspiciousness, light, and material and spiritual fulfillment, as well as the consort of Vishnu, the maintainer or preserver. However, Lakshmi does not signify mere material wealth, but also abstract prosperity, such as glory, magnificence, joy, exaltation, and greatness, and spiritual fulfillment, which translates to moksha.

Parvati is also worshipped as Durga and Kali as the goddess of power, war, beauty, and love. She is the consort of Shiva, the destroyer of evil, or transformer.

Importance

Mahasarasvati is described to be the slayer of Shumba in the Devi Bhagavata Purana, suggesting that she has little to do with Saraswati.

Mahalakshmi is the prosperity aspect of Devi. She has two forms, Vishnu-priya Lakshmi and Rajyalakshmi. The former is the embodiment of chastity and virtuousness. The latter goes about courting kings. Rajyalakshmi is stated to be fickle and impulsive. She enters all those places where virtue and charity may be  found, and as soon as these two vanish from any place, Rajyalakshmi will also vanish from that place.

Mahakali represents darkness, pure tamas personified. Mahakali is one of the three primary forms of Devi. She is stated to be a powerful cosmic aspect (vyaṣṭi) of Devi, and represents the guna (universal energy) named tamas, and is the personification of the universal power of transformation, the transcendent power of time.

Outside India
Via Buddhism and syncretism with Japanese Shinto deities, the Tridevi entered Japanese mythology as the goddesses Benzaitennyo 弁財天女 (Sarasvati), Kisshoutennyo 吉祥天女 (Laxmi), and Daikokutennyo 大黒天女 (Mahakali or Parvati).

See also

Devi
Buddhist Tenbu (天部) deities
Trimurti
Trinity
Triple deities

References

External links
Tridevi statues in the Mahalaxmi temple in Mumbai

Hindu philosophical concepts
Names of God in Hinduism
Triple goddesses
Hindu goddesses
Feminist theology